Vivien Sándorházi (born 3 January 2001) is a Hungarian badminton player affiliated with Újpesti Tollaslabda SE who competes in international level events. She is a bronze medalist at the 2018 European Junior Championships and has represented her country at the 2018 Summer Youth Olympics.

Achievements

European Junior Championships 
Girls' singles

BWF International Challenge/Series (2 runner-up)
Women's singles

  BWF International Challenge tournament
  BWF International Series tournament
  BWF Future Series tournament

BWF Junior International (12 titles, 6 runners-up) 
Girls' singles

Girls' doubles

Mixed doubles

  BWF Junior International Grand Prix tournament
  BWF Junior International Challenge tournament
  BWF Junior International Series tournament
  BWF Junior Future Series tournament

References

External links 

 

2001 births
Living people
Sportspeople from Budapest
Hungarian female badminton players
Badminton players at the 2018 Summer Youth Olympics